Statue of Leif Erikson may refer to

 Leif, the Discoverer (Whitney)
 Statue of Leif Erikson (Boston)
 Statue of Leif Erikson (Chicago)